Fred Crisman:  Cave of the Space Nazis is a 2022 animated comedy film based on the tales of Fred Crisman, a 20th-century eccentric who claimed to have fought inhuman monsters in subterranean caverns in the 1940s.

Synopsis
The film begins with the disclaimer:  "The following events are apparently true, based on the many claims of Fred Lee Crisman.  Technically, we can't prove this didn't happen."

The first scene sees Fred Crisman broadcasting from Tacoma radio station KAYE.  Crisman tells listeners he was not involved with the Kennedy assassination, saying "I could never have performed such a stunt...", before slyly adding "alone".  Crisman claims he  has protected the Earth from aliens, saying to doubters "If you don't believe that I protected this world from egregious extraterrestrials, then I simply ask you:  Where are they?  I don't see any aliens here.  You're welcome!"

In flashback to 1946,  the film introduces Raymond Palmer, the editor of Unbelievable Tales Magazine, as Crisman recounts an adventurous story of being shot down over the Bay of Bengal during the Second World War.  Making his way to Cheduba Island, Crisman seeks shelter in a cave, where he discovers the dead bodies of soldiers.  Venturing further into the cave,  Crisman discovered the cave is inhabited by the Deros, evil monsters who believe themselves to be the true superior race of the Earth.   When Crisman witnesses the Deros torture a victim, he pulls out a pistol, firing it while screaming "Die, you Space Nazi Monsters!".

Crisman is wounded in the firefight, receiving a scar on his shoulder (Palmer notes that medical records indicate scar was present when Crisman first enlisted, but Crisman dismisses this as a Deros forgery).  Killing many of the enemy, Crisman escapes and lives to tell the tale.

Cast
 Brock Baker as Richard Shaver
 Pat Cashman as Fred Crisman
 Gabriella Castro	as Radio Jingle Singer
 Alec Crisman as Radio Announcer
 Meghan Nigrelli as The Computer
 Hellbent as Dero Victim
 Bryan Shickley as The Deros
 Nathaniel Williams as Raymond Palmer

Reception

Promotional material described the film emerging after "a group of talented folks asked the question 'Why hasn't Fred Crisman had a movie yet?'"

The film premiered on August 4, 2022, at Gen Con Film Festival, where it garnered the award for Best Comedy.
Director Bryan Shickley told reporters: "I love the utter outrageousness that is Fred Lee Crisman, and no matter how you feel about his claims, you just can’t come away from spending time with Crisman without forming strong feelings about him."

The film was an official selection of the Brooklyn SciFi Film Festival.

References

Fred Crisman
Shaver Mystery
Films based on urban legends
UFO-related films
Films set in Washington (state)